The following is a list of radio stations in the Canadian province of Manitoba, .

See also 
 Lists of radio stations in North and Central America

External links
Canadian Communications Foundation History of Radio stations in the Province of Manitoba

Manitoba
Radio stations